Private Screenings is a television documentary and reality series that aired on Turner Classic Movies in 1995. The series is hosted by Robert Osborne and features noted personalities from the Golden Age of Hollywood, with clips from his or her work. A special episode dedicated to Osborne aired in 2014.

Notable celebrities who were featured on the show have included

June Allyson
Lauren Bacall
Ernest Borgnine
Leslie Caron
Tony Curtis
Stanley Donen
Jane Fonda
James Garner
Charlton Heston
Betty Hutton
Norman Jewison
Angela Lansbury
Jack Lemmon
Sidney Lumet
Shirley MacLaine
Walter Matthau
Ann Miller
Liza Minnelli
Walter Mirisch
Robert Mitchum 
Patricia Neal
Jane Powell
Anthony Quinn
Debbie Reynolds
Mickey Rooney
Jane Russell
Rod Steiger
Esther Williams

On October 2, 2006, the series had an episode on child stars, rather than on an individual person. Featured on that episode were Darryl Hickman, Jane Withers, Margaret O'Brien, and Dickie Moore.

References

External links

1995 American television series debuts
2010 American television series endings
1990s American reality television series
2000s American reality television series
2010s American reality television series
1990s American documentary television series
2000s American documentary television series
2010s American documentary television series
Turner Classic Movies original programming